Přísaha is an extra-parliamentary political party in the Czech Republic, founded in 2021 by .

History
Šlachta became known to the public as the investigator in a political corruption scandal in 2013. Following media speculation in 2020 that he could found a new political party, Šlachta announced his new party at a press conference on 27 January 2021, stating that it would campaign against corruption, and would participate in the 2021 general election. Šlachta's party is named Přísaha, taken from the title of his autobiography, Třicet let pod přísahou. Šlachta has also criticised the Czech government for its handling of the COVID-19 pandemic.

Other figures involved in the party include Šlachta's former police colleagues Tomáš Sochr and Jiří Komárek.

Election results

Chamber of Deputies

References

Přísaha
2021 establishments in the Czech Republic
Anti-corruption parties in the Czech Republic
Centrist political parties in the Czech Republic
Political parties established in 2021
Political parties in the Czech Republic
Populism in the Czech Republic